Ufi (also Romanized as ‘Ūfī) is a village in Noabad Rural District, Arvandkenar District, Abadan County, Khuzestan Province, Iran. At the 2006 census, its population was 13, in 5 families.

References 

Populated places in Abadan County